Rex Putnam High School (often Putnam High School) is a public high school in Milwaukie, Oregon, United States.

History
The school was named after former Oregon Superintendent of Public Instruction Dr. Rex Putnam.

Rex Putnam has been an International Baccalaureate school since the spring of 2008. As such, the school offers the International Baccalaureate Diploma Programme to its Juniors and Seniors. Approximately 46% of the Junior class and 40% of the Senior class is enrolled in one or more IB courses as of 2010. Rex Putnam is the only North Clackamas high school that houses the IB Programme. Colleges and Universities around the world recognize the IB Programme and it is a very high honor to complete it.

Academics
In 1985, Rex Putnam High School was honored in the Blue Ribbon Schools Program, the highest honor a school can receive in the United States.

In 2008, 81% of the school's seniors received their high school diploma. Of 306 students, 249 graduated, 31 dropped out, 11 received a modified diploma, and 15 are still in high school.

Arts
Rex Putnam has competed in the Northwest Oregon Conference at the 5A classification since the fall of 2010.

Rex Putnam's A Capella Choir has earned five first-place titles at the OSAA State Choir Championships, with their latest being in 2022, where they placed first in 5A.

Notable alumni
 Bella Bixby (1995-), professional soccer player for Portland Thorns FC
 Mike Bliss (1965-), NASCAR Busch Series driver
 Scott Brosius (1966-), professional baseball player for New York Yankees, MVP of 1998 World Series
 Randy Emberlin, comic book artist
 Gabe Nevins (1991-), actor, 2007 film Paranoid Park

References

External links
 Rex Putnam High School Website

Milwaukie, Oregon
High schools in Clackamas County, Oregon
International Baccalaureate schools in Oregon
Educational institutions established in 1963
Public high schools in Oregon
1963 establishments in Oregon